Ambrosius Francken I (1544–1618) was a Flemish painter known for his religious works and historical allegories painted in a late Mannerist style.  He was a prominent member of the Francken family of artists, which played a very important role in the Flemish art scene from the late 16th to middle 17th century.

Life
Ambrosius Francken I was born in Herentals.  His father was the painter Nicolaes Francken from Herentals who later moved to Antwerp.  His brothers Frans Francken I and Hieronymus Francken I both became successful painters.  Ambrosius studied under his father and the leading Antwerp Mannerist painter Frans Floris.   The early biographer Karel van Mander reports in the Schilder-boeck that Francken spent time in Tournai where he lived at the Bishop's residence.  Van Mander met him in Tournai while he himself was residing there as a young pupil at his master Pieter Vlerick's house.  In 1570 Francken spent some time in Fontainebleau.

Around 1573 Ambrosius Francken I was back in Antwerp where he joined the local Guild of Saint Luke as a master.   Ambrosius lived in a very turbulent time due to the conflict between Calvinists and Catholics in the Low Countries.  In 1577 Antwerp had elected a Calvinist city council.  The council ordered in 1581 the systematic removal of all images from local churches.  This event is referred to as the 'silent iconoclasm'. Ambrosius, who is believed to have converted to Calvinism himself, was elected  dean of the Guild in 1582.  After the Fall of Antwerp, the city became Catholic again and Ambrosius made it known he was Catholic again.

He clearly established a name for himself as a prolific maker of the many altarpieces that replaced the ones destroyed during the iconoclastic troubles.  His reputation was such that in 1589 he together with Maerten de Vos was appointed by the Ghent magistrate to value the painting of the Last Judgment by Raphael Coxie.  Raphael Coxie was involved in a dispute with the Ghent magistrate who he felt was offering a sum that was too low for his masterpiece.  Ambrosius Francken and Marten de Vos were also chosen as the chief designers of the decorations for the 1594 Joyous Entry into Antwerp of the newly appointed governor of the Southern Netherlands, Archduke Ernest of Austria.

He married Clara Pickarts and later became the teacher of Hieronymus Francken II, the son of his brother Frans Francken I.  He died in Antwerp.

Work

Ambrosius Francken I is known for religious works and historical allegories.  He made large altarpieces for churches in Antwerp that replaced the many artworks that had disappeared during the iconoclastic fervour of the Beeldenstorm a few decades before.  His compositions depicting muscular figures based on classical prototypes exercised an important influence on contemporary artists.

His style shows the influence of Marten de Vos in the opulently draped robes and other details. He occasionally painted the staffage in the landscapes of Abraham Govaerts.

Many of his works that have survived depict martyrdoms, a theme popular in Counter-Reformation Flanders.  One of his important commissions was the painting of the triptych for the Guild of Barbers and Surgeons in 1590.  One of the wings of the triptych depicts the miracles of the Saints Cosmas and Damian. The saints' most famous miraculous exploit was the grafting of a leg from a recently deceased Ethiopian to replace a patient's ulcered or cancerous leg.  Unlike earlier representations of the subject which accentuate the role of the divine by including angels, a halo around the saints' heads and the role of the peaceful sleep of the patient receiving the transplant, Ambrosius' composition dwells more on the technique of the amputation and also shows the patient as a normal person whose face is distorted in pain.  The saints have no nimbus and do not have help of angels.  They use their own hands and their instruments are lying on the floor and are clearly recognizable.  The depiction is more naturalistic than the earlier representations as it discounts the miraculous and makes the technical procedure take centre stage.

During his Calvinist period (roughly 1579 to 1585) Ambrosius was responsible for a set of engravings called The Fate of Mankind that strongly criticised, even ridiculed, the Catholic clergy.

Very few of his drawings have survived.  Some drawings of scenes from the commedia dell’arte (including a drawing at the Amsterdam Museum) that are ascribed to Ambrosius I are interesting and show plays that he may have seen while residing in Fontainebleau in the 1570s.

References

External links

Family tree

1544 births
1618 deaths
Flemish Renaissance painters
Flemish history painters
Flemish genre painters
People from Herentals
Ambrosius 1